Theresina is a genus of beetles in the family Cerambycidae. It contains the following species:

 Theresina grossepunctata Breuning, 1963
 Theresina punctata (Pic, 1927)

References

Apomecynini